The 1942 Copa Adrián C. Escober Final was the final that decided the winner of the 3rd edition of the Copa Adrián C. Escobar, an Argentine domestic cup organised by the Argentine Football Association. The match was contested by the two teams that had played in the previous final, River Plate and Huracán.

The final was held in River Plate Stadium on December 1, 1942. Huracán defeating River Plate 2–0 and winning their first Copa Escobar trophy.

Qualified teams

Overview 
This edition was contested by the seven best placed teams of the 1942 Primera División season. River Plate, as champion, advanced directly to semifinals. The matches only lasted 40 minutes (two halves of 20' each), with some teams playing two games a day. All the matches were held in River Plate Stadium.

In the tournament, Huracán beat Newell's Old Boys (4–2 on corner kicks awarded after finishing 0–0) and then beat rival San Lorenzo de Almagro (1-0 in extra time).

Match details

References

e
e
1942 in Argentine football
Football in Buenos Aires